The Samuel E. Hackman Building, also known as the A.L. Barner Hardware Company Building, is a historic commercial building located at Hartsburg, Missouri. It was built in 1897 and expanded about 1903.  It is a two-story, rectangular frame building with a flat facade.  It features the original elaborate iron and frame storefront.

It was added to the National Register of Historic Places in 1998.

References

Commercial buildings on the National Register of Historic Places in Missouri
Commercial buildings completed in 1903
Buildings and structures in Boone County, Missouri
National Register of Historic Places in Boone County, Missouri